"Morning Dew," also known as "(Walk Me Out in the) Morning Dew," is a contemporary folk song by Canadian singer-songwriter Bonnie Dobson.  The lyrics relate a fictional conversation in a post-nuclear holocaust world. Originally recorded live as a solo performance, Dobson's vocal is accompanied by her finger-picked acoustic guitar playing.

In 1962, "Morning Dew" was included on the live Bonnie Dobson at Folk City album. Subsequently, the song was recorded by other contemporary folk and rock musicians, including the Grateful Dead, who adapted it using an electric rock-ensemble arrangement for their debut album.

Background and lyrics
The song is a dialogue between the last man and woman left alive following an apocalyptic catastrophe. Dobson stated that the inspiration for "Morning Dew" was the film On the Beach, which is about the survivors of virtual global annihilation by nuclear holocaust. Dobson wrote the song while staying with a friend in Los Angeles; she recalled how the guests at her friend's apartment were speculating about a nuclear war's aftermath and "after everyone went to bed, I sat up and suddenly I just started writing this song [although] I had never written [a song] in my life." In 1961, Dobson premiered "Morning Dew" at the inaugural Mariposa Folk Festival and a live recording appeared on Dobson's At Folk City album in 1962. In 1969, she recorded a studio version for her self-titled album.

Renditions
The earliest release of a studio version of "Morning Dew" was on the 1964 self-titled album by the Goldebriars, using the title "Come Walk Me Out" without giving songwriter credit to Dobson. It was followed about a month later by a recording by singer-guitarist Fred Neil with Vince Martin, for their album Tear Down The Walls.  Tim Rose followed with a version (credited to Rose and Dobson) for his self-titled debut album. According to Dobson, "all Tim Rose did was take Freddie Neil's changes."  Dobson claimed she never met Rose but she received a 75 percent songwriting royalty, as she retains sole writing credit for the song's music.

"Morning Dew" became part of the Grateful Dead's repertoire after frontman Jerry Garcia was introduced to the Fred Neil recording by roadie Laird Grant in 1966. The group first played the song as their opening number at the Human Be-In in January 1967; the same month the group recorded it for their self-titled debut album, released that March.

American psychedelic rock band The West Coast Pop Art Experimental Band released "Morning Dew" under the title "Will You Walk With Me" on its album Part One in February 1967.  American folk group The Pozo-Seco Singers and U.K. band Episode Six both released versions of the song as singles in 1967.

British pop singer Lulu recorded "Morning Dew" in 1967 for her album Love Loves To Love Lulu, produced by John Paul Jones, and it was featured on a single in the U.S., Canada and Australia in 1968.
Duane and Gregg Allman recorded the song in 1968 with The 31st of February; the sessions were released in 1972 on Bold Records. 

The Jeff Beck Group, with Rod Stewart on vocals, recorded the song for their 1968 album Truth, carrying over some aspects of the Tim Rose version including the bass part. In 1969, the Swiss band Krokodil and Cleveland, Ohio band The Damnation of Adam Blessing both included versions of "Morning Dew" on their eponymous debut albums.
Scottish rockers Nazareth included the song on their 1971 debut, in an extended arrangement similar to the Jeff Beck Group's, and released a single version the following year. 

Long John Baldry included "Morning Dew" on his self-titled 1980 album and on a single the same year.  Blackfoot's cover is the opening track on their 1984 album Vertical Smiles. German band Einstürzende Neubauten released its cover on the 1987 album Fünf auf der nach oben offenen Richterskala. Devo covered the song on Smooth Noodle Maps, released in 1990. Robert Plant performed the song on his 2002 album Dreamland, and Skating Polly has a version of "Morning Dew" on their 2016 album The Big Fit.

References

External links
 The Story of Bonnie Dobson's Morning Dew (CBC hour-long radio documentary Inside the Music)

1962 songs
Contemporary folk songs
Songs about nuclear war and weapons
Grateful Dead songs
Jeff Beck songs